Germanus was a Caesar of the Byzantine Empire. He married Charito, a daughter of Tiberius II Constantine and Ino Anastasia.

According to Michael Whitby, Germanus was a patrician and governor of the praetorian prefecture of Africa. He was chosen by the dying Tiberius II as a viable heir for his throne in 582. "In a dual ceremony on 5 August Germanus ... and Maurice were elevated to the rank of Caesar and betrothed to Tiberius' two daughters, Charito and Constantina."

Whitby regards the arrangement as indicating Tiberius' plans to have two co-rulers as successors. He suggests that the dying emperor might have even been trying to reintroduce the concept of a Western and Eastern Roman Emperor, with Germanus and Maurice chosen for their respective connections to the western and eastern provinces of the Empire. Whitby identifies this Germanus with a similarly named son born to Germanus (d. 550) and Matasuntha.

According to a statement in Jordanes' Getica, the senior Germanus was a descendant of the noble Roman clan of the Anicii. The exact nature of his connection, however, if it is anything more than a literary device to indicate noble descent, is unclear. Theodor Mommsen hypothesized that his mother could have been a daughter of Anicia Juliana. Matasuntha was a daughter of Eutharic and Amalasuintha. She was a sister of Athalaric, King of the Ostrogoths. Their maternal grandparents were Theodoric the Great and Audofleda. Whitby suggests that a dual origin from the Anicii and Ostrogoth royalty would indeed give the new Caesar a strong claim to ruling Africa and the Praetorian prefecture of Italy. However, the common name "Germanus" may hint to these figures being related to each other but there are insufficient evidence for identifications.

The chronicle of John of Nikiû records on the death of Tiberius: "He died in peace in the third year of his reign. It was owing to the sins of men that his days were so few; for they were not worthy of such a Godloving emperor, and so they lost this gracious and good man. Before he died he gave orders that his son-in-law, named Germanus, should be raised to the imperial throne. Now he had formerly been patrician. But owing to his humility of heart he refused to be emperor. Thereupon Maurice, who was of the province of Cappadocia, was made emperor." Whitby considers this to be the only primary source for Tiberius preferring Germanus over Maurice. He feels it has more to do with John's bias against Maurice than accuracy. John of Nikiû vehemently criticizes the religious policies of Maurice and even calls him a pagan.

The narrative of John of Nikiû is contradicted by the Historia Francorum of Gregory of Tours which also records Byzantine events. He depicts Maurice as hand-picked to be heir, first by dowager empress Sophia and then by Tiberius II.

Germanus disappears from sources following his marriage. He may have resurfaced as the patricius Germanus mentioned in the 7th century, whose daughter married Maurice's eldest son Theodosius. Once again, the identification is uncertain.

References

Sources

External links
The Emperor Maurice and his historian: Theophylact Simocatta on Persian and Balkan warfare
Gold medallion commemorating Germanus' marriage to Charito

Justinian dynasty
6th-century Byzantine people
Caesars (heirs apparent)
Anicii